{{DISPLAYTITLE:Rhaetian Railway Ge 4/4 II}}

The Rhaetian Railway Ge 4/4 II is a class of metre gauge Bo′Bo′ electric locomotives operated by the Rhaetian Railway (RhB), which is the main railway network in the Canton of Graubünden, Switzerland.

The class is so named because it was the second class of locomotives of the Swiss locomotive and railcar classification type Ge 4/4 to be acquired by the Rhaetian Railway. According to that classification system, Ge 4/4 denotes a narrow gauge electric adhesion locomotive with a total of four axles, all of which are drive axles.

History

The 23 Ge 4/4 II locomotives, numbered 611 to 633, were placed in service in 1973 (first series) and 1984 (second series). The last example of the second series, named Zuoz and numbered 633, was completed only in 1985.  The Ge 4/4 II replaced the Ge 6/6 I (Crocodile), which was becoming less and less reliable.

Ever since its delivery, the Ge 4/4 II class has been in service on the whole of the core network of the Rhaetian Railway, at the head of both passenger trains and freight trains.  Since 1997, the class has also served on the Arosa Line following its conversion to 11 kV  Hz AC.  The Ge 4/4 IIs can work double headed in multiple-unit train control operation.  In combination with control cars of the series BDt 1751-58, acquired in 1999, they can also operate shuttle trains.

Since 1999, some units have been given new square headlights upon being technically revised, but their appearance has otherwise remained the same.

From 2004, all 23 locomotives were fully modernised as part of a refit program, involving, amongst other things, the replacement of the analogue control electronics with modern computer supported instrumentation.  The last four locomotives to be updated in this program were nos. 612, 619, 627 and 632, in 2008.

As of 2018 rumours has it that Ge 4/4 II no. 611 Landquart is to be saved for possible preservation in Rhb Historic.

Technical details

In their external appearance, the Ge 4/4 II locomotives, supplied by Swiss Locomotive and Machine Works (SLM) and Brown, Boveri & Cie (BBC), are reminiscent of the Re 4/4II of the Swiss Federal Railways.

The electrical componentry is nevertheless markedly different: in the Re 4/4 II locomotives, controlled rectifiers (phase fired controllers) made of thyristors and diodes supply the traction motors with wavy direct current.

Livery

The first series of the class, nos. 611–620, were originally green liveried, but have since been reliveried in the still contemporary Rhaetian Railway standard red.  The second series, numbered 621–633, was delivered already painted in the red livery.

Each individual locomotive in the class is named after a town along the Rhaetian Railway network in Graubünden. The relevant name is applied in white letters to the right and left sides near the top of the locomotive.  Each locomotive's traffic number (between 611 and 633) is featured on both of its ends, and low down on both of its sides.  Adjacent to its name, each locomotive also bears the coat of arms of the community after which it was named.

List of locomotives
The following locomotives of the Ge 4/4 II class are in service with the Rhaetian Railway:

See also

A further development of this class, the FO Ge 4/4 III, was acquired in 1979 by the Furka Oberalp Bahn.
History of rail transport in Switzerland
Rail transport in Switzerland

References

Further reading 

 
 

This article is based upon a translation of the German language version as at December 2009.

SLM locomotives
Brown, Boveri & Cie locomotives
Bo′Bo′ locomotives
Electric locomotives of Switzerland
11 kV AC locomotives
Rhaetian Railway locomotives
Railway locomotives introduced in 1973
Metre gauge electric locomotives